Magnus John Thorsteinson (March 19, 1905 — August 24, 1948) was a Canadian professional ice hockey right winger who played 4 games in the National Hockey League for the New York Americans during the 1932–33 season. The rest of his career, which lasted from 1922 to 1935, was spent in various minor leagues.

Career statistics

Regular season and playoffs

External links
 

1905 births
1948 deaths
Buffalo Majors players
Canadian ice hockey right wingers
Canadian people of Icelandic descent
Duluth Hornets players
Edmonton Eskimos (ice hockey) players
Minneapolis Millers (CHL) players
Moose Jaw Maroons players
New Haven Eagles players
New York Americans players
Regina Capitals players
St. Louis Flyers (AHA) players
St. Paul Saints (AHA) players
Selkirk Jr. Fishermen players
Ice hockey people from Winnipeg
Wichita Vikings players
Winnipeg Maroons players